Orchesella quinquefasciata is a species of slender springtail in the family Entomobryidae. It is found in Europe.

References

External links

 

Collembola
Articles created by Qbugbot
Animals described in 1842
Arthropods of Europe